Ibrahim Maraachli or Meraachli (27 January 1937 – 15 September 2004) was a Lebanese television, radio and stage actor and comedian. He took part in a great number of plays on Lebanese television and stage for three decades. He was best known for Lebanese made TV series such as Al mouaallima wal oustaz (The teacher and the professor), "Ibrahim Afandi" and "Captain Bob".

Career
He started his career in the 1960s with roles in Egyptian and Lebanese films. Then he worked with famous Lebanese comedian, actor and playwright Hassan Alaa Eddin popularly known as Chouchou or Shoushou when the latter established the National Theatre (known as Al Masrah al Watani المسرح الوطني) with roles in many Chouchou's plays. He worked in radio mainly in comedic sketches, and was greatly famous with his roles on Lebanese national television for a great number of popular television series and in voice over of a number of cartoons.

Theatre
Chouchou in Sofar (Master Chouchou in Sawfar) شوشو في صوفر
Akh ya baladna آخ يا بلدنا 
Funduq al Sa'aada فندق السعادة
Chouchou wal Malyoun (Chouchou and the Million) شوشو والمليون 
Adas wa Caviar (Beans and Caviar) عدس وكافيار
Hait el Jiran (The Wall of the neighbours) حيط الجيران
Weslet lal 99 - وصلت لل 99
Stop Madrasat Bob (Stop Bob's School) ستوب مدرسة بوب
El Cowboy Marra min Huna (The Cowboy Passed from Here) الكاوبوي مر من هنا

Filmography
Cinema
Antar Yaghzou al Sahraa' عنتر يغزو الصحراء
Badawiyyah fi Paris بدوية في باريس
Ajmal Ayyam Hayati أجمل أيام حياتي
Al Ukhwa al Gurabaa' الأخوه الغرباء
Paris wal Hobb باريس والحب
Maw'ed maa'l Hayat موعد مع الحياة

Television
Captain Bob كابتن بوب
Ibrahim Efendi إبراهيم أفندي
Al mouaallima wal oustaz (The teacher and the professor) المعلمة والأستاذ
Burj el Hubb برج الحب
Secreterat al Baba سكرتيرة البابا
Al Layl al Tawil الليل الطويل
Ayaam al Dirasa أيام الدراسة
Ya Mudeer يا مدير
Masrah al Fukahah مسرح القكاهة
Al Aghani wal Ma'aani الأغاني والمعاني
... and others

Voice overs 
Kimba the White Lion - Al Layth al Abiad  الليث الأبيض 
Astroganger - Ghuzat min al Fadaa' غزاة من الفضاء
Treasure Island - Jazirat al Kanz - جزيرة الكنز
Arabian Nights: Sinbad's Adventures - Mughaamaraat Sindibaad - مغامرات سندباد
..and others

References

Lebanese male actors
1937 births
2004 deaths